Wonder Wheel is a 2006 album by neo-Klezmer band The Klezmatics. It features lyrics by Woody Guthrie which were unrecorded during his life. It won the Grammy Award for Best Contemporary World Music Album at the 49th Grammy awards.

See also
Woody Guthrie Foundation
Woody Guthrie's Happy Joyous Hanukkah (2006)
Mermaid Avenue (1998)
Man in the Sand (1999)
Mermaid Avenue Vol. II (2000)
The Works (2008)
New Multitudes (2012)
Mermaid Avenue: The Complete Sessions (2012)

References

2006 albums
Grammy Award for Best Contemporary World Music Album
Woody Guthrie tribute albums
The Klezmatics albums
Shout! Factory albums